Kharaqan-e Sofla (also Romanized as Kharaqān-e Soflá; also known as Kharakān-e Soflá, Kharakān-e Pā’īn, Kharagan, Kharakān, and Kharkan) is a village in Ilat-e Qaqazan-e Sharqi Rural District, Kuhin District, Qazvin County, Qazvin Province, Iran. At the 2006 census, its population was 67, in 20 families.

References 

Populated places in Qazvin County